Distinguish from the road of the same name in Cape Town, South Africa, on the eastern side of Table Mountain.

The Southern Cross Drive is a  dual carriage untolled motorway in Sydney, New South Wales, Australia. Part of the M1 and Sydney Orbital Network, the road, a freeway that opened in 1969, links the Eastern Distributor and South Dowling Street at Kensington in the north to General Holmes Drive at Sydney Airport in the south.

In August 2013 the Southern Cross Drive carried about 20,000 vehicles per day, both north and southbound.

A road project to extend Southern Cross Drive further south-west as an elevated roadway over Wentworth Avenue, Botany and Mill Pond Roads - and over reclaimed swampland including the Mill Pond, the Mill Steam, and Botany Dams, much of which has been reclaimed for golf courses (including the Eastlakes Golf Club, The Lakes Golf Club and Bonnie Doon Golf Club) - to connect directly to General Holmes Drive on the eastern border of Sydney Airport, opened in February 1988.

Alignment
With the development of many other motorways and freeways, Southern Cross Drive is part of the  Sydney Orbital Network, providing links without interruption between Greater Western Sydney, Eastern Suburbs, the North Shore and Hills District. It allows a continuous link from the M5 Motorway, General Holmes Drive, Westlink M7, Eastern Distributor, Cahill Expressway, Sydney Harbour Tunnel, Sydney Harbour Bridge, Warringah Freeway, M4 Motorway, Gore Hill Freeway, Lane Cove Tunnel and the M2 Hills Motorway.

It has connection points at Mill Pond Drive / Botany Road, Wentworth Avenue, Link Road and O'Dea / Todman Avenues. There were plans to construct south-facing ramps from Gardeners Road to Southern Cross Drive.

South of Wentworth Avenue and north of Botany Road, Southern Cross Drive is elevated above the ARTC Southern Sydney Freight Line. A road bridge carrying Gardeners Road was completed in 1969, elevated above Southern Cross Drive at Eastlakes.

Exits and interchanges

Gallery

See also

 Freeways in Sydney
 Sydney Airport
 Southern Cross (aircraft)

References

Streets in Sydney
Highway 1 (Australia)